The Chief of Staff, Mediterranean Fleet also formally known as Chief of Staff to the Commander-in-Chief Mediterranean Fleet  and originally called Flag Captain, Mediterranean Fleet. was a senior British Royal Navy appointment. He was the commander-in-chiefs primary aide-de-camp providing administrative support from October 1893 to 1967.

History
The office was created in October 1893 the first incumbent of the office was Captain Francis C. B. Bridgeman. From May, 1905 until July, 1912 the office holder also held the additional title of Flag Captain, Mediterranean Fleet or formally Flag Captain to the Commander-in-Chief, Mediterranean Fleet. During a period of restructuring and cost cutting from 1954 and 1971 senior fleet commands were either abolished or merged into fewer but larger commands. As part of continuing cost cutting by the Ministry of Defence in 1967 the Mediterranean Fleet was abolished along with this office. The final office holder was Commodore David B. N. Mellis.

Chiefs of Staff, Mediterranean Fleet
Post holders included:
 Captain Francis C. B. Bridgeman: October 1893-December 1894
 Captain William H. May: January 1895-November 1896
 Captain William des V. Hamilton: November 1896-July 1899
 Captain George F. King-Hall: March 1900-May 1902
 Captain the Hon. Stanley J.C. Colville: May 1902-May 1905
 Captain F.C. Doveton Sturdee: May 1905-March 1907
 Captain Ernest C. T. Troubridge: March 1907-October 1908
 Captain John S. Luard: October 1908-March 1909
 Captain John de M. Hutchison: March 1909-April 1910
 Captain Bernard Currey: April 1910-March 1911
 Captain Stuart Nicholson: March 1911-June 1912
 Commodore Richard F. Phillimore: June 1912-August 1914
 Commodore Rudolf M. Burmester: August 1917-August 1919
 Rear-Admiral William W.Fisher: August 1919-May 1922
 Commodore Barry E. Domvile: May 1922-May 1925
 Rear-Admiral A.Dudley P.R.Pound: May 1925-December 1927
 Rear-Admiral Wilfred Tomkinson: December 1927-May 1928
 Rear-Admiral John K. im Thurn: May 1928-May 1930
 Rear-Admiral William M. James: May 1930-April 1931
 Rear-Admiral Sidney R. Bailey: April 1931-October 1932
 Rear-Admiral Arthur E.F. Bedford: October 1932-June 1934
 Rear-Admiral Robert H. T. Raikes: June 1934-October 1935
 Admiral Sir A.Dudley P.R.Pound: October 1935-May 1936
 Rear-Admiral G. Frederick B. Edward-Collins: May 1936-April 1938
 Rear-Admiral Bruce A. Fraser: April 1938-February 1939
 Rear-Admiral Algernon U. Willis: February 1939-March 1941
 Rear-Admiral John H. Edelsten: March 1941-December 1942
 Commodore John G. L. Dundas: December 1942-February1943
 Commodore Royer M. Dick: February–November 1943
 Rear-Admiral John G. L. Dundas: November 1943-August 1944
 Rear-Admiral Herbert A. Packer: August 1944-March 1946
 Rear-Admiral Guy Grantham: March 1946-March 1948 
 Rear-Admiral H. Geoffrey Norman: March 1948-April 1950
 Commodore Thomas M. Brownrigg: April 1950-May 1952
 Rear-Admiral Manley L. Power: May 1952-November 1953
 Commodore Wilfrid J.W. Woods: November 1953-September 1955
 Commodore Desmond P. Dreyer: September 1955-July 1957
 Rear-Admiral Christopher D. Bonham-Carter: July 1957-May 1959
 Rear-Admiral Joseph C.C. Henley: May 1959-October 1961
 Commodore Patrick U. Bayly: October 1961 – 1963
 Commodore Herbert J. Lee: March 1963-July 1965
 Commodore David B. N. Mellis: July 1965 – 1967

References

Sources
 Harley, Simon; Lovell, Tony (9 January 2019). "Mediterranean Station - The Dreadnought Project". www.dreadnoughtproject.org. Harley and Lovell.   
 Mackie, Colin (January 2019). "Chief of Staff, Mediterranean Fleet" (PDF). gulabin.com. C. Mackie. pp. 148–149. Retrieved 1 February 2019.
 Navy Notes". Royal United Services Institution. Journal. 80 (519): 644–651. 11 September 2009. doi:10.1080/03071843509420903.
 Smith, Gordon. "Royal Navy Organisation and Ship Deployment 1947-2013: Summary of Fleet Organisation 1972-1981". www.naval-history.net. Gordon Smith.

M